World War Memorial Library, also known as Corning City Club, is a historic library building located at Corning in Steuben County, New York. It is a -story brick structure in a combination of the Colonial Revival and Classical Revival styles.  Built in 1897 to house the Corning City Club, it became home to the library and memorial to Corning natives who lost their lives in World War I following a fire in 1926. The original architects were Pierce & Bickford of Elmira, with the later remodeling by Palmer Rogers of New York City.

It was listed on the National Register of Historic Places in 1995.

References

External links
World War Memorial Library website

Libraries on the National Register of Historic Places in New York (state)
Colonial Revival architecture in New York (state)
Neoclassical architecture in New York (state)
Cultural infrastructure completed in 1897
Buildings and structures in Steuben County, New York
Corning, New York
National Register of Historic Places in Steuben County, New York